Giuseppe Eusanio (1619 – 23 April 1692) was a Roman Catholic prelate who served as Titular Bishop of Porphyreon (1672–1692) and Titular Bishop of Helenopolis in Bithynia (1669–1670).

Biography
Giuseppe Eusanio was born in Prata d'Ansidonia, Italy in 1619 and ordained a priest in the Order of Saint Augustine. On 2 December 1669, he was appointed during the papacy of Pope Clement IX as Titular Bishop of Helenopolis in Bithynia. On 4 May 1670, he was consecrated bishop by Giacomo Franzoni, Bishop of Camerino, with Giambattista Spínola, Archbishop of Genoa, and Francesco Maria Febei, Titular Archbishop of Tarsus serving as co-consecrators. On 2 May 1672, he was appointed during the papacy of Pope Clement X as Titular Bishop of Porphyreon. He served as Titular Bishop of Porphyreon until his death on 23 April 1692.

Episcopal succession

References

External links and additional sources
 (for Chronology of Bishops) 
 (for Chronology of Bishops)  
 (for Chronology of Bishops) 
 (for Chronology of Bishops)  

17th-century Roman Catholic titular bishops
Bishops appointed by Pope Clement IX
Bishops appointed by Pope Clement X
1619 births
1692 deaths
Augustinian bishops
Prata d'Ansidonia